Salagena transversa is a moth in the family Cossidae. It is found in the Republic of Congo, the Democratic Republic of Congo, Sierra Leone, South Africa and Togo.

References

Natural History Museum Lepidoptera generic names catalog

Metarbelinae
Moths described in 1865